Sarah Najjuma, (Born on October 23, 1978), is a female Ugandan politician and a teacher by profession. She is a member of parliament for the Nakaseke Constituency in the Parliament of Uganda representing the ruling National Resistance Movement (NRM) party. She was elected to this position in February 2016. She replaced Rose Namayanja, the former women representing Nakaseke District who served from May 2006 – February 2016.

Background and education 
In 1995, she accomplished her Primary Leaving Examination from Nalinya Lwantale Primary School. In 1996, she obtained her Uganda Certificate of Education in Nabisunsa Girls School. In 1998, she attained her Uganda Advanced Certificate of Education at Nabisunsa Girls School. She holds a Bachelor of Arts in education, from Makerere University and Master of Arts in Development Studies from Nkumba University. In 2011, she obtained a Postgraduate Diploma in Public Administration and Management in Nkumba University.

Career history 
Between 2004 and 2005, she worked as a community development officer, Luweero District Local Government.

From 2005 to 2007, she was the community development officer for Nakaseke District Local Government.

From 2007  to 2015 , she was the Senior Community Development Officer, Nakaseke District Local Government.

From 2016 to date, she is a member of parliament.

Personal life 
Najjuma is a married person and comes from an Islamic background. She is interested in netball and loves playing it during her free time.

References 

Living people
People from Nakaseke District
Members of the Parliament of Uganda
Women members of the Parliament of Uganda
National Resistance Movement politicians
1978 births
21st-century Ugandan politicians
21st-century Ugandan women politicians